In set theory, a branch of mathematics, a reflection principle says that it is possible to find sets that resemble the class of all sets. There are several different forms of the reflection principle depending on exactly what is meant by "resemble".

The name "reflection principle" comes from the fact that properties of the universe of all sets are "reflected" down to a smaller set.

Motivation
A naive version of the reflection principle states that "for any property of the universe of all sets we can find a set with the same property". This leads to an immediate contradiction: the universe of all sets contains all sets, but there is no set with the property that it contains all sets. To get useful (and non-contradictory) reflection principles we need to be more careful about what we mean by "property" and what properties we allow.

To find non-contradictory reflection principles we might argue informally as follows. Suppose that we have some collection A of methods for forming sets (for example, taking powersets, subsets, the axiom of replacement, and so on). We can imagine taking all sets obtained by repeatedly applying all these methods, and form these sets into a class V, which can be thought of as a model of some set theory. But now we can introduce the following new principle for forming sets: "the collection of all sets obtained from some set by repeatedly applying all methods in the collection A is also a set". If we allow this new principle for forming sets, we can now continue past V, and consider the class W of all sets formed using the principles A and the new principle. In this class W, V is just a set, closed under all the set-forming operations of A. In other words, the universe W contains a set V that resembles W in that it is closed under all the methods A.

We can use this informal argument in two ways. We can try to formalize it in (say) ZF set theory; by doing this we obtain some theorems of ZF set theory, called reflection theorems. Alternatively we can use this argument to motivate introducing new axioms for set theory.

Reflection principles are associated with attempts to formulate the idea that no one notion, idea, statement can capture our whole view of the universe of sets. Kurt Gödel described it as follows:

Georg Cantor expressed similar views on Absolute Infinity: All cardinality properties are satisfied in this number, in which held by a smaller cardinal.

In ZFC
In trying to formalize the argument for the reflection principle of the previous section in ZF set theory, it turns out to be necessary to add some conditions about the collection of properties A (for example, A might be finite). Doing this produces several closely related "reflection theorems" of ZFC all of which state that we can find a set that is almost a model of ZFC.

One form of the reflection principle in ZFC says that for any finite set of axioms of ZFC we can find a countable transitive model satisfying these axioms. (In particular this proves that, unless inconsistent, ZFC is not finitely axiomatizable because if it were it would prove the existence of a model of itself, and hence prove its own consistency, contradicting Gödel's second incompleteness theorem.) This version of the reflection theorem is closely related to the Löwenheim–Skolem theorem.

Another version of the reflection principle says that for any finite number of formulas of ZFC we can find a set Vα in the cumulative hierarchy such that all the formulas in the set are absolute for Vα (which means very roughly that they hold in Vα if and only if they hold in the universe of all sets). So this says that the set Vα resembles the universe of all sets, at least as far as the given finite number of formulas is concerned. In particular for any formula of ZFC there is a theorem of ZFC that the formula is logically equivalent to a version of it with all quantifiers relativized to Vα. See .

If κ is a strong inaccessible cardinal, then there is a closed unbounded subset C of κ, such that for every α∈C, the identity function from Vα to Vκ is an elementary embedding.

The reflection principle for ZFC is a theorem schema that can be described as follows: Let  be a formula with at most free variables . Then ZFC proves that

As new axioms

Bernays class theory

Paul Bernays used a reflection principle as an axiom for one version of set theory (not Von Neumann–Bernays–Gödel set theory, which is a weaker theory). His reflection principle stated roughly that if A is a class with some property, then one can find a transitive set u such that A∩u has the same property when considered as a subset of the "universe" u. This is quite a powerful axiom and implies the existence of several of the smaller large cardinals, such as inaccessible cardinals. (Roughly speaking, the class of all ordinals in ZFC is an inaccessible cardinal apart from the fact that it is not a set, and the reflection principle can then be used to show that there is a set that has the same property, in other words that is an inaccessible cardinal.) Unfortunately, this cannot be axiomatized directly in ZFC, and a class theory like Morse–Kelley set theory normally has to be used. The consistency of Bernays's reflection principle is implied by the existence of an ω-Erdős cardinal.

More precisely, the axioms of Bernays' class theory are:
 extensionality
 class specification: for any formula  without  free, 
 subsets: 
 reflection: for any formula , 
 foundation
 choice
where  denotes the powerset.

According to Akihiro Kanamori, in a 1961 paper, Bernays considered the reflection schema

for any formula  without  free, where  asserts that  is transitive.

Others
Some formulations of Ackermann set theory use a reflection principle. Ackermann's axiom states that, for any formula  not mentioning ,

Peter Koellner showed that a general class of reflection principles deemed "intrinsically justified" are either inconsistent or weak, in that they are consistent relative to the Erdös cardinal. However, there are more powerful reflection principles, which are closely related to the various large cardinal axioms. For almost every known large cardinal axiom there is a known reflection principle that implies it, and conversely all but the most powerful known reflection principles are implied by known large cardinal axioms. An example of this is the wholeness axiom, which implies the existence of super-n-huge cardinals for all finite n and its consistency is implied by an I3 rank-into-rank cardinal.

Add an axiom saying that Ord is a Mahlo cardinal — for every closed unbounded class of ordinals C (definable by a formula with parameters), there is a regular ordinal in C. This allows one to derive the existence of strong inaccessible cardinals and much more over any ordinal.

References

External links
 Mizar system proof: http://mizar.org/version/current/html/zf_refle.html

Set theory
Mathematical principles